Adrienne is the French feminine form of the male name Adrien. Its meaning is literally "from the city Hadria."

 Adrienne Ames (1907–1947), American actress
 Adrienne Armstrong (born 1969), wife of Green Day frontman Billie Joe Armstrong
 Adrienne Arsenault (born 1967), Canadian journalist
 Adrienne Bailon (born 1983), member of girl group The Cheetah Girls and host of the Real Talk Show
 Adrienne Barbeau (born 1945), American actress
 Adrienne Beames (born 1942), Australian long-distance runner
 Adrienne Bolland (1896–1975), French test pilot and first woman to fly over the Andes
 Adrienne Clarke (born 1938), Australian botanist and former Lieutenant Governor of Victoria
 Adrienne Clarkson (born 1939), Canadian journalist and former Governor General of Canada
 Adrienne Corri (born 1933), Scottish actress
 Adrienne Fazan (1906–1986), American Academy Award-winning film editor
 Adrienne Frantz (born 1978), American actress and singer-songwriter
 Adrienne Goodson (born 1966), American former professional basketball player
 Adrienne Horvath (1925–2012), French politician
 Adrienne Kennedy (born 1931), African-American playwright
 Adrienne Krausz (born 1967), Hungarian pianist
 Adrienne de La Fayette (1759–1807), wife of Gilbert du Motier, Marquis de Lafayette
 Adrienne La Russa (born 1948), American actress
 Adrienne Lau, American singer and actress
 Adrienne Lecouvreur (1692–1730), French actress
 Adrienne Maloof (born 1961), American businesswoman and television personality
 Adrienne Pearce, South African actress 
 Adrienne Posta (born 1948), English actress
 Adrienne Rich (1929–2012), American poet and essayist
 Adrienne Roy (born 1953), comic book colorist
 Adrienne Shelly (1966–2006), American filmmaker and actress
 Adrienne Simpson (1943–2010), New Zealand broadcaster, historian, musicologist and writer
 Adrienne Steckling-Coen (1934-2006), American fashion designer known as Adri
 Adrienne Du Vivier (1626–1706), one of the first white women settlers in Montreal
 Adrienne Vittadini (born 1945), Hungarian-American fashion designer
 Adrienne Wu (born 1990), Canadian fashion designer

Fictional characters
 Adrienne Attoms, from the Netflix original series Project Mc²
 Adrienne Delaney, protagonist in the 1995 computer game Phantasmagoria
 Adrienne Frost, Marvel Comics character
 Adrienne Johnson Kiriakis, from the soap opera Days of our Lives

See also
 Adrian
 Adrianne

References

French feminine given names